Marcelle Fanny Henriette Soulage (12 December 1894 – 17 December 1970) (sometimes published under the name of Marc Sauval) was a French pianist, music critic and composer.

Career
Marcelle Soulage was born in Lima, Peru, to French parents. Her father was a mining engineer and had been appointed Professor of Mineralogical Chemistry in Lima. The family returned to Paris when Marcelle was four-and-a-half years old. She began piano lessons at the age of five, and subsequently entered the Conservatoire de Paris studying with Georges Caussade, Paul Vidal, Vincent d'Indy and Nadia Boulanger. Soulage served as professor of piano and harmony at the Conservatoire d'Orléans (1921–1925) and professor of solfege at the Conservatoire de Paris (1949–1965).

Soulage composed orchestral works, chamber music and songs, sometimes writing under the pseudonym Marc Sauval. Her Suite for violin, viola and piano won the Prix Lépaulle in 1918, and Cello Sonata the Prix des Amis de la Musique in 1920.

Soulage's music is published by: Evette & Schaeffer; Buffet-Crampon; Max Eschig; Rouart, Lerolle & Cie; L. Philippo.

She died in Paris, France.

Selected works
Orchestral
 Valse (1911); composed under the pseudonym Marc Sauval
 Menuet (1918); composed under the pseudonym Marc Sauval
 Danse cosaque, Op. 77 (1927)
 Invocation à la nuit et danse orientale (1928)
 Badinages (1931)

Chamber music
 3 Pièces brèves for flute (or violin, or cello, or oboe) and piano, Op. 9
     Danse
     Berceuse
     Scherzo
 Légende for flute, oboe and harp, Op. 13 (1917)
 Suite in C minor for violin, viola and piano (1918)
 Pastorale for oboe (or English horn) and harp (or piano), Op. 15 (1918)
 Fantaisie concertante for cornet and piano, Op. 19
 Sonata for viola and piano, Op. 25 (1919)
 Sonata in F minor for cello and piano, Op. 31 (1919)
 Piano Trio in A minor, Op. 34 (1922)
 Sonata in G major for flute and piano, Op. 35
 Sonata in D minor violin and piano, Op. 36 (1920)
 Sonata for viola solo, Op. 43 (1921)
 String Quartet in C minor (1922)
 Piano Quartet (1925)
 Prélude et danse fantasque for cornet and piano (or orchestra), Op. 80 (published 1930)
 Les Premiers Ensembles, 6 Pièces progressives for violin and piano (1931)
 Rêverie et danse exotique for double bass and piano (or orchestra) (published 1954); composed for the Concours du Conservatoire national de musique de Paris
 Fantaisie hébraïque "Yis-roël" for viola and piano
 Sonate pastorale for flute and bassoon

Harp
 Pièce in C minor for 2 harps (1916)
 Petites pièces for harp (1916)
     Choral in A minor
     Danse in C minor
 Barcarolle for harp, Op. 17

Keyboard
 Variations sur une chanson populaire L'avocat for piano (1918)
 Suite de danses anciennes for piano (or harp, or piano 4-hands), Op. 32
 Improvisation sur un thème de Vincent d'Indy for piano, Op. 41
 30 Petits préludes dans tous les tons (sans octaves; d'assez facile à moyenne force) for piano, Op. 45 (1922)
 4 Pièces enfantines for piano, Op. 45 (1922); extracts from 30 Petits préludes dans tous les tons, Op. 45
 Sur la grande route des soldats chantent. Fantaisie sur la chanson populaire "Auprès de ma blonde"(1923)
 2 Pièces caractéristiques for piano (pour petites mains), Op. 78 (published 1927)
     Jean qui pleure
     Jean qui rit
 Dialogues: Ronde villageoise for harpsichord (1939)
 Pages choisies d'hier et d'aujourd'hui: 34 Pièces de difficulté progressive, classées et doigtées for piano (published 1955)

Vocal
 Berceuse d'Armorique for voice and piano (1912); words by Anatole Le Braz
 Babillarde! À une aronde! (Hirondelle) for mezzo-soprano and piano (1917); words by Jean-Antoine de Baïf
 Ballade: Cette fille, elle est morte! for baritone and piano (1917); words by Paul Fort
 De plaines en plaines for soprano and piano (1917); words by Robert de Souza
 Dormez-vous? for baritone and piano (1917); words extracted from Dominical (1892) by Max Elskamp
 D'un vanneur de blé aux vents! for tenor and piano (1917); words by Joachim du Bellay
 Il est en moi des pensées! for baritone and piano (1917); words by Carlos Larronde
 Nocturne for mezzo-soprano and piano (1917); words by Jean Moréas
 Mélodies for voice and piano, Op. 12 (1917)
     Cantilène de la pluie; words by Auguste Gaud	
     Pâle et lente; words by André Rivoire
 Yver, vous n'estes qu'un villain (Hiver, vous n'êtes qu'un vilain) for voice and piano, Op. 14 (1920); words by Charles d'Orléans
 Chant maternel, Mélodie for voice and piano (1922); words by Jules Grisez-Droz; composed under the pseudonym Marc Sauval
 Au balcon des mélancolies for voice and piano, Op. 20; words by Jean Hytier
 Dessus le quai (d'après une chanson populaire) for voice and piano, Op. 24; words by Jean Hytier
 Laissez-moi mourir lentement for voice and piano, Op. 27 (1922); words by Pierre Aguétant
 Sur la rivière noire for medium voice and piano, Op. 28 (1923); words by Raymond Philippon
 Rendez-vous dans le parc for female voice and piano, Op. 29 (1923); words by Jean Hytier
 Le Gai printemps for soprano or tenor and piano; words by Paul Rispal

Choral
 Choral: Chant donné pour le contrepoint rigoureux (1913)
 Le Repos en Egypte, Chorus in 4 parts for female chorus and piano (1917); words by Albert Samain
 Lamentation des 300 captives du Roi des Morts, Chorus in 3 parts for female chorus and piano or orchestra, Op. 48 (1922); words by Chrétien de Troyes
 A Lauterbach, Chanson for 4 mixed voices a cappella (1937); words by the composer after Alsatian texts
 Hymne au travail: Laboremus for 2-part children's chorus and piano (1937); words by Jean Bergeaud
 Hymne des créatures d'après St François d'Assise for unison chorus and piano, or organ, or harmonium (1948); also for 3 voices a cappella; words by René Christian-Frogé
 Qui veut avoir liesse, Double Canon for 4 mixed voices a cappella; words by Clément Marot
 Recueillement, Chorus in 2 parts for soprano and female chorus; words by Georges Parmentier

Literary and pedagogical works
 Mes exercices for piano (1946)
 Douze Leçons de solfège: à changements de clefs sur toutes les clefs (difficiles et très difficiles), Henry Lemoine, 1953.
 Principes de théorie musicale, Henry Lemoine, 1955.
 Dictées polyphoniques, Henry Lemoine, 1956.
 Le solfège, Presses universitaires de France, 1962.
 Rythmes et modes: 20 Leçons de solfège à changements de clés sur toutes les clés, avec accompagnement de piano, Henry Lemoine, 1962.

References

1894 births
1970 deaths
20th-century classical composers
French classical composers
French women classical composers
French music educators
Conservatoire de Paris alumni
Academic staff of the Conservatoire de Paris
20th-century French women musicians
20th-century French composers
Women music educators
20th-century women composers
French expatriates in Peru